Iwona Blecharczyk (born 24 September 1987) is a lorry driver and YouTuber, a native of Poland. In 2013, she established the channel "Trucking Girl" on the YouTube website and then, in 2019, was awarded with the title of Barbie Shero as a role model for girls.

Biography
She comes from Subcarpathian Voivodeship. In 2007 she took part in the Miss Polonia beauty contest and ended up in the finals of Miss Polonia of Podkarpacie in Mielec. In 2010, when she graduated from university, Iwona Blecharczyk became a qualified teacher of English as a foreign language. She worked as a minibus driver on the routes from Poland to England, then she worked in the clothing industry. In 2011, she started working as a professional lorry driver.

In 2013, she founded the channel "Trucking Girl" as part of the YouTube website: she presents videos taken from her lorry cabin and talks on transport-related topics. The channel is run in two languages – Polish and English. The viewers from Poland account for about half of the audience Outside of Poland, the recordings are statistically most frequently watched in Germany, the United States, Canada and the United Kingdom. She runs fan pages on Instagram and Facebook, too. In 2017 she was the face of euroShell (the card was later replaced by Shell card in 2018).

In the period 2017–2018, Blecharczyk travelled to North America (Canada, the United States), were she was working as a driver of specialized lorries, riding along, among others, the Ice Trail and the oil fields.

In 2019, Mattel awarded her (as the second Polish woman after Martyna Wojciechowska) the title of Barbie Shero. She has become the ambassador for the company Volvo Trucks.

She was invited to participate as a speaker in a TEDx conference and worked as a volunteer. In Poland Discovery Channel has chosen Blecharczyk to run the TV series Przygody truckerki (Trucker woman's adventures).

Around the world, the media wrote about Iwona Blecharczyk; they were, among others, (in German) weekly Die Zeit, Der Spiegel Panorama, (in French) Canadian daily La Presse from Montreal, the website metropolitaine.fr from Bordeaux, (in Hungarian)  the website on transport (vezess.hu)

In 2020, the Muza S.A. publishing house published a 320-page book by Iwona Blecharczyk Trucking girl. 70-metrową ciężarówką przez świat (en: Trucking girl. With a 70-meter truck through the world), on topics similar to her internet activities.

References

External links
Official Iwona Blecharczyk's YouTube channel

1987 births
Living people
Polish YouTubers
People from Podkarpackie Voivodeship
Polish women writers
Writers from Kraków